Kush Arora, who has produced under the name Only Now since 2013 is a music producer and DJ from San Francisco. Arora blends use of the tumbi and the algoze flute from his Indian Punjabi heritage with industrial, metal, punk, goth, bhangra, and more before shifting to experimental, dub, and dancehall inspired creations in the late 1990s. 

In 2012 he started a radio show called Surya Dub Radio on Berkeley's KPFA 94.1FM Radio, California's largest independent station with Maneesh The Twister.

References

External links 
 

Dub musicians
Bhangra (music)
Living people
Record producers from California
Businesspeople from San Francisco
American male musicians of Indian descent
American musicians of Indian descent
Year of birth missing (living people)
Desi musicians